HD 24040 is a metal-rich G-type star located approximately 152 light-years away in the constellation of Taurus. In 2006 a long-period planet was discovered.

Planetary system
A long period planet was discovered in 2006 based on observations made at the W. M. Keck Observatory in Hawaii. However because the observations covered less than one complete orbit there were only weak constraints on the period and mass. The first reliable orbit for HD 24040b was obtained by astronomers at Haute-Provence Observatory in 2012 who combined the keck measurements with ones from the SOPHIE and ELODIE spectrographs. The most recent orbit published in 2015 added additional keck measurements and refined the orbital parameters.

A linear trend in the radial velocities indicating a possible additional companion was detected at Haute-Provence Observatory and was also detected at keck but at a much smaller amplitude. The linear trend was confirmed in 2021, together with the discovery of another planet, HD 24040 c.

Planet c is in the habitable zone, with an ecc of <0.2, and may have a habitable moon.

See also
 HD 154345
 List of extrasolar planets

References

External links
 

024040
017960
Planetary systems with one confirmed planet
Taurus (constellation)
G-type main-sequence stars
Durchmusterung objects